The Eyre Yorke Block, also known as the Eyre and Yorke mallee, is an interim Australian (IBRA) bioregion and a World Wildlife Fund ecoregion covering part of the Eyre Peninsula and all of Yorke Peninsula as well as land to its immediate east in South Australia.

Location and description
These peninsulas consist of hilly country originally covered in eucalyptus woodland. However this is good soil for farming and the woodland has mostly been cleared for agriculture now. This coast has a temperate climate with a wet winter (300mm to 600mm of rainfall per year).

Subregions
The IBRA identifies five subregions of the bioregion:
 Southern Yorke – 
 St Vincent – 
 Eyre Hills – 
 Talia – 
 Eyre Mallee –

Flora
The original vegetation of these low hills was woodland of short trees with a shrubby undergrowth. The original woodland consisted mainly of a tea tree Melaleuca lanceolata and mallee box (Eucalyptus porosa), a mallee eucalyptus. The flora of the two peninsulas does differ, with the Eyre Peninsula flora having similarities with areas further west as well as number of endemic species, while the Yorke Peninsula has plants typical of areas to the east.

Fauna
Mammals of the region include the western grey kangaroo and the southern hairy-nosed wombat, although many more (such as the tammar wallaby have become extinct on the two peninsulas since they have been cleared for farmland. Birds include the emu.

Threats and preservation
Most of the area has been cleared for farmland resulting in reduced populations and local extinction of much wildlife, especially on Yorke Peninsula. However clearance has mostly ceased now and the northern areas of Eyre Peninsula in particular still have large areas of mallee woodland while the coastal dunes remain mostly unspoilt also. Weeds, fertiliser and herbicide runoff are still threatening habitats. Protected areas include Innes National Park on Yorke Peninsula.

Protected areas
15.24% of the ecoregion is in protected areas. They include:

 Adelaide International Bird Sanctuary National Park—Winaityinaityi Pangkara
 Buckleboo Conservation Reserve
 Coffin Bay National Park
 Cortlinye Conservation Reserve
 Cunyarie Conservation Reserve
 Gawler Ranges National Park
 Hambidge Wilderness Protection Area
 Hincks Wilderness Protection Area
 Innes National Park
 Lacroma Conservation Reserve
 Lincoln National Park
 Memory Cove Wilderness Protection Area
 Moongi Conservation Reserve
 Mootra Conservation Reserve
 Mount Remarkable National Park
 Pinkawillinie Reservoir Conservation Reserve
 Poolgarra Conservation Reserve
 Tola Conservation Reserve
 Wardang Island Indigenous Protected Area
 Yalata Indigenous Protected Area

References

Further reading
 Thackway, R and I D Cresswell (1995) An interim biogeographic regionalisation for Australia : a framework for setting priorities in the National Reserves System Cooperative Program Version 4.0 Canberra : Australian Nature Conservation Agency, Reserve Systems Unit, 1995. 

 
IBRA regions
Mallee Woodlands and Shrublands
Mediterranean forests, woodlands, and scrub in Australia
Ecoregions of South Australia